Hope S. Rugo  is professor of medicine and the director of the breast oncology clinical trials program at the University of California at San Francisco, and an investigator of SPORE (Specialized Program of Research Excellence in Breast Cancer) in the Bay Area.

In 2014 Rugo chaired the advisory panel of OncLive's "Giants of Cancer Care" award program.

Rugo was lead investigator on research that investigated the hair-preserving properties of cold caps for patients undergoing chemotherapy.

Along with her studies she is also an active clinician who gives lectures locally as well as internationally and nationally.

Education 

 Tufts University, BS, 1979, Chemistry
 University of Pennsylvania, MD, 1984, Medicine
 University of California San Francisco, 1987, Resident, Internal Medicine
 University of California San Francisco, 1990, fellow, Hematology/Oncology
 Stanford University, 1988–90, postdoctoral fellowship, Microbiology/Immunology
 DNAX Institute of Cellular and Molecular Biology, 1989–90, visiting scientist, immunology

Awards 

 College Summa Cum Laude, Phi Beta Kappa, Sigma Xi; Victor Prather Prize for Excellence in Scientific Research; Durkee Scholarship for promise and achievement in the field of chemistry; Max Tishler Prize Scholarship for outstanding achievement in the sciences
 Medical School Henry Luce Scholar in the Philippines; Certificate of Commendation, Philadelphia Area Project on Occupational Safety and Health; National Health Service Corps Scholarship; Janet M. Glasgow Memorial Achievement Citation
 Fellowships Awarded Bank of America Giannini Foundation Research Fellowship

References

External links
 

Year of birth missing (living people)
Living people
American oncologists
Women oncologists
University of California, San Francisco faculty
20th-century American scientists
21st-century American scientists
20th-century American women scientists
21st-century American women scientists